The Lorimar Sports Network, or LSN, was an American ad hoc television network providing syndicated college football and basketball. It was based at Lorimar's original headquarters in Culver City, California, with an additional office in Dallas, Texas. It was in operation from 1983 until 1986.

History

Beginning 
It began in 1983 as a new sports broadcasting division of Lorimar Productions, adopting the branding Sports Productions, Incorporated, or SPI. It then became the Lorimar Sports Network in Summer 1984.

Sports programming
Under both banners, the Lorimar Sports Network had a history of bringing major events in men's college basketball and football. It acquired Southeastern Conference (SEC) basketball from the TVS Television Network in 1983. It also acquired rights to the Big Ten, Metro and WAC. The SEC on SPI/Lorimar ran from January 1984 until the end of the 1985-1986 season.

LSN also broadcast the Freedom Bowl in 1985, along with the Holiday and Bluebonnet Bowls at the end of the 1985-86 football season, as well as Pacific-10 Conference football during those years.

Demise
The Lorimar Sports Network dissolved over time when they lost broadcast rights to all the conferences they had rights for, especially after the end of the 1985-1986 sports season. Rights to Metro Conference basketball were the first to be lost by LSN as Raycom Sports won rights to the Metro in 1985, and then the Big Ten conference in 1989, two years after Raycom won rights to basketball games from the Big 8 (now Big 12) conference; both the Big 8 and Big Ten were acquired by Raycom in 1987. The 1986 SEC and Pacific-10 Conference men's basketball tournaments (except the championships) were LSN's last sports broadcast because Raycom won syndication rights to the Pac-10 starting with the 1986-87 season. As for SEC Basketball, Raycom's Atlantic Coast Conference broadcast partner, Jefferson-Pilot Teleproductions (later Jefferson Pilot Sports, Lincoln Financial Sports, now part of Raycom Sports) won those rights beginning with the 1986-87 basketball season, added SEC football in 1992, and those rights remained with that company (which became Lincoln Financial Sports in 2006, and became part of Raycom Sports on January 1, 2008) until the end of the 2008-2009 season. The Freedom and Bluebonnet Bowls, however, ended up with the Mizlou Television Network for the 1986, 1987, and 1988 installments.

Just before the end of the 1985-1986 season, Lorimar completed a merger with Telepictures, to form Lorimar-Telepictures. After the Lorimar Sports Network was dissolved in summer 1986, the Lorimar studio itself, including its extensive library of produced and/or distributed programming, was bought out in its entirety by the Burbank, California-based Warner Bros. studio in 1993. Telepictures, on the other hand, once again became a separate production and syndication company under Time Warner ownership.

Notable on-air personalities
This is a partial list. 
Tom Hammond, play-by-play commentator (SEC basketball, 1985 Bluebonnet Bowl, 1985 Holiday Bowl)
Joe Dean, color analyst (SEC basketball)
Tim Brando, play-by-play commentator (Metro Conference basketball)
John Rooney, play-by-play commentator (Metro Conference basketball)
Bob Carpenter, play-by-play commentator (Big Ten basketball)
Irv Brown, Color analyst (WAC basketball)
Barry Tompkins, play-by-play commentator (1985 Freedom Bowl, PAC-10 Conference Football) 
Steve Grote, color analyst (Metro Conference Basketball)
Lou Holtz, color analyst (1985 Freedom Bowl) 
Gifford Nielsen, color analyst (1984 Texas AAAAA State Football Championship and 1985 Bluebonnet Bowl) 
John Laskowski, color analyst (Big Ten Basketball)
Terry Donahue, color analyst (1985 Holiday Bowl) 
Verne Lundquist, Play by Play (1983 Texas AAAAA State Football Championship)
Roger Staubach, color analyst (1983 Texas AAAAA State Football Championship)
Darryl Royal, color analyst (1983 Texas AAAAA State Football Championship) 
Brad Sham, Play by Play (1984 Texas AAAAA State Football Championship)

See also 
TVS Television Network 
Mizlou Television Network
Raycom Sports

References

   
   

 

Defunct television networks in the United States
College sports television syndicators
Sports television networks in the United States
Television channels and stations established in 1983
Television channels and stations disestablished in 1986
Television production companies of the United States